Midi Madagasikara is a daily newspaper owned by Midi Madagasikara S.A. and published in Antananarivo, Madagascar. It began distribution on August 18, 1983. 

The paper is published from Monday to Saturday and is primarily in French, with two pages in Malagasy and a bi-monthly single page in English. It is printed in a tabloid format with regular sections on politics, economy, society, sports, culture, and world news.

See also
 List of newspapers in Madagascar

External links
Midi Madagasikara online edition

Newspapers published in Madagascar
Publications established in 1983